George Hustler Tuck (28 April 1843 – 13 December 1920) was an English lawyer and a cricketer who played in 18 first-class cricket matches between 1863 and 1876, most of them for Cambridge University and the Marylebone Cricket Club (MCC). He was born and died at Norwich, Norfolk.

Tuck was educated at Eton College and at Trinity College, Cambridge. He was in the Eton cricket team as a right-handed middle-order batsman in both the 1861 and 1862 Eton v Harrow matches. In his first match for Cambridge University in 1863, he also kept wicket, but that does not appear to have been a regular job, and he was merely an opening batsman in the 1863 University Match against Oxford University, his only other first-class match that season. In all, he appeared four times in the University Match, and was unsuccessful on each occasion, Cambridge losing all four games. His greatest success as a batsman came in consecutive games against MCC and Surrey in 1865 in which he played two separate innings of 51. After leaving Cambridge University, Tuck played in only a few first-class matches for MCC teams and for Southgate Cricket Club in 1867, and a single further match for MCC in 1876.

Tuck graduated from Cambridge University in 1866 with a Bachelor of Arts degree. Before graduation, he was attached to Lincoln's Inn, and he was then called to the bar in 1868, practising as a barrister on the South Eastern Circuit. He was later a justice of the peace in Norfolk and a deputy lieutenant of Norfolk, and he lived at Blofield Hall, near Norwich.

References

External links

1843 births
1920 deaths
English cricketers
Cambridge University cricketers
Marylebone Cricket Club cricketers
Southgate cricketers
People educated at Eton College
Alumni of Trinity College, Cambridge
Deputy Lieutenants of Norfolk
English justices of the peace
Gentlemen of Marylebone Cricket Club cricketers
People from Blofield
English barristers